Danilo Arboleda Hurtado (born 16 May 1995) is a Colombian footballer who plays as a defender for Emirati club Al Ain.

Career
Arboleda made his debut for Deportivo Cali in the Categoría Primera A on 12 February 2015. He has later played for four other clubs in the Colombian top division, namely Patriotas Boyacá, América de Cali, La Equidad and Deportivo Pasto.

On 1 February 2021, Arboleda signed for Moldovan National Division club FC Sheriff Tiraspol.

References

External links

1995 births
Living people
Sportspeople from Valle del Cauca Department
Association football central defenders
Colombian footballers
Colombian expatriate footballers
Deportivo Cali footballers
Patriotas Boyacá footballers
América de Cali footballers
La Equidad footballers
Deportivo Pasto footballers
FC Sheriff Tiraspol players
Al Ain FC players
Categoría Primera A players
Moldovan Super Liga players
UAE Pro League players
Expatriate footballers in Moldova
Expatriate footballers in the United Arab Emirates
Colombian expatriate sportspeople in Moldova